Lara Downes is an American classical pianist and cultural activist who has made the popularization of classical music by women and black Americans one of her causes. She was selected as the Classical Woman of the Year for 2022 by a poll of listeners to the radio program Performance Today.

She is host of the NPR show AMPLIFY with Lara Downes and is an Artist Ambassador for Headcount, working to promote participation in democracy through music.

Discography
Exiles' Cafe (2013)
America Again (2016)
For Lenny (2018)
Holes in the Sky (2019)
For Love of You (2019)
Florence Price Piano Discoveries (2020)
Reflections: Scott Joplin Reconsidered (2022)

References

External links
Lara Downes' Web site

Living people
Year of birth missing (living people)